Charles Woodruff Yost (November 6, 1907 – May 21, 1981) was a career U.S. Ambassador who was assigned as his country's representative to the United Nations from 1969 to 1971.

Biography 
Yost was born in Watertown, New York. He attended the Hotchkiss School, where he was a member of the class of 1924 that included Roswell Gilpatric, Paul Nitze and Chapman Rose, before graduating from Princeton University in 1928. He did postgraduate studies at the École des Hautes Études International (École pratique des hautes études) in Paris.  Over the next year he traveled to Geneva, Berlin, the Soviet Union (with author Croswell Bowen), Poland, Rumania, Hungary, Yugoslavia, Spain, and Vienna.

Yost joined the U.S. Foreign Service in 1930 on the advice of former Secretary of State Robert Lansing, and served in Alexandria, Egypt as a consular officer, followed by an assignment in Poland. In 1933 he left the Foreign Service to pursue a career as a freelance foreign correspondent in Europe and a writer in New York.

After his marriage to Irena Rawicz-Oldakowska, he returned to the U.S. State Department in 1935, becoming assistant chief of the Division of Arms and Munitions Control in 1936. In 1941, he represented the State Department on the Policy Committee of the Board of Economic Warfare. Yost was appointed assistant chief of special research in 1942, and was made assistant chief of the Division of Foreign Activity Correlation in 1943. In February of the next year he became executive secretary of the Department of State Policy Committee. He attended the Dumbarton Oaks Conference from August to October 1944, when he worked on Chapters VI and VII of the United Nations Charter. He then served at the United Nations Conference on International Organization in San Francisco in April 1945 as aide to Secretary of State Edward Stettinius. In July of that year he was secretary-general of the Potsdam Conference.

In 1945 Yost was reinstated in the Foreign Service, and later that year he served as political adviser to U.S. Lieutenant General Raymond Albert Wheeler on the staff of Lord Louis Mountbatten in Kandy, Ceylon. He then became chargé d'affaires in Thailand during the short reign of Ananda Mahidol. Throughout the late 1940s and the 1950s, his assignments took him to Czechoslovakia, Austria (twice), and Greece. In 1954, he was named minister to Laos, and he became the first United States ambassador there a year later. In 1957, he was minister counselor in Paris. At the end of the same year he was named ambassador to Syria. Shortly after his appointment, Syria and Egypt formed the United Arab Republic, and the U.S. was asked to close its embassy in Syria. Yost was then sent as ambassador to Morocco in 1958.

In 1961, he began his first assignment at the United Nations as the deputy to Ambassador Adlai Stevenson. After Stevenson's death in 1965, Yost stayed on as deputy to Ambassador Arthur Goldberg. In 1964, Yost was promoted to the rank of Career Ambassador, the highest professional Foreign Service level, in recognition of especially distinguished service over a sustained period.

In 1966 he resigned from the Foreign Service to begin his career as a writer, at the Council on Foreign Relations, and as a teacher, at Columbia University.

In 1969, President Richard Nixon called Yost out of retirement to become the permanent United States representative to the United Nations. He resigned in 1971 and returned to writing, at the Brookings Institution, and teaching at Georgetown University's School of Foreign Service.

Yost set forth his views in a syndicated newspaper column, for The Christian Science Monitor, and in four books — The Age of Triumph and Frustration: Modern Dialogues, The Insecurity of Nations, The Conduct and Misconduct of Foreign Relations, and History and Memory.

In 1974, Yost was awarded the Foreign Service Cup by his fellow Foreign Service officers.

In 1979, Yost was co-chairman of Americans for SALT II, a group that lobbied the Senate for passage of the second Strategic Arms Limitation Treaty. He was a trustee of the American University in Cairo, Egypt, and director of the Aspen Institute for cultural exchanges with Iran. He took part in the unofficial Dartmouth Conferences of United States and Soviet scholars. In 1973, he was named head of the National Committee on United States-China Relations; he visited the People's Republic of China in 1973 and 1977.

Yost died of cancer on May 21, 1981, at Georgetown University Hospital in Washington, D.C.

His papers are at Princeton University Library, Mudd Library, Department of Rare Books and Special Collections.

Family 
Yost's ancestors, who were driven out of the German Palatinate by Louis XIV's armies at the end of the 17th century, settled in the valley of the Mohawk River in New York State. Others were of Scotch-Irish origin and came to this country with the immigration that took place about the middle of the 18th century.

Yost's ancestor, Edward Howell, founded Watermill on Long Island, New York and his ancestor Abraham Cooper founded Oxbow, New York. His ancestor, Brigadier General Nicholas Herkimer, was a Revolutionary War hero.

Yost's father Nicholas, an attorney, judge and bank president was married to his mother Gertrude by Pastor Dulles, the father of Secretary of State John Foster Dulles.

In 1934, Yost married Irena Rawicz-Oldakowska in Poland. Her father was Kazimierz Ołdakowski, the pre-war director of Fabryka Broni. They had two sons, Nicholas and Casimir, and a daughter Felicity.

Career timeline 
1931: Vice Consul Alexandria, Egypt
1932: Vice Consul Warsaw, Poland
1933: Resigned from the Foreign Service and became a journalist
1935:
1) Progress Report Specialist at the Resettlement Administration
2) Divisional Assistant, U.S. Department of State, Division of Western European Affairs
3) Assistant Chief, U.S. Department of State, Office of Arms and Munitions Control
1936: Division of Arms and Munitions Control
1939: Assistant Chief, U.S. Department of State, Division of Controls
1941:
1) Assistant Chief, U.S. Department of State, Division of Exports and Defense Aid
2) Assistant to the U.S. High Commissioner to the Commonwealth of the Philippines
1941-42: Designated to act in Liaison between Division of European Affairs of State Department and British Empire Division of the Board of Economic Warfare
1942:
1) Assistant Chief, U.S. Department of State, Division of European Affairs, Office of Foreign Territories, Security Committee
2) Member of the Inter-Divisional Country and Area Committees of the Advisory Committee on Problems of Foreign Relations
3) Assistant Chief, U.S. Department of State, Division of Special Research
1943: 
1) Division of European Affairs 
2) Office of Foreign Economic Coordination, U.S. Department of State
1943-44: Assistant Chief, U.S. Department of State, Division of Foreign Activity Correlation
1944:
1) Executive Secretary, Department of State Policy Committee
2) Division of International Security and Organization
3) Executive Secretary, U.S. Department of State, Joint Secretariat of the Executive Staff Committee
4) Assistant to the chairman for the Dumbarton Oaks Conference
1945:
1) Special Assistant to the chairman, Secretary of State Stettinius, U.S. Delegation to the United Nations Conference on International Organizations, San Francisco
2) Secretary-General, U.S. Delegation, Berlin Conference, Potsdam Agreement
3) Assigned as U.S. Political Adviser to General Wheeler, Deputy Supreme Allied Commander to the Southeast Asia Command (SEAC), India & Ceylon
4) Assigned as U.S. Political Adviser to General Thomas Terry, Commander of the American India-Burma Theater
1946:
1) Chargé d'affaires, Bangkok, Thailand
2) U.S. Delegation to UNESCO, United Nations, Lake Success, New York
3) Political Adviser to U.S. Delegation, General Assembly of the United Nations
1947: First Secretary & Counselor, Prague, Czechoslovakia
1947-49: Deputy High Commissioner, and First Secretary & Counselor of Legation, Vienna, Austria
1949:
1) Member of U.S. Delegation; Special Assistant to Ambassador at Large for Sixth Session of the Council of Foreign Ministers Meeting, Paris, France
2) Member of Delegation to Fourth Regular Session of the General Assembly of the United Nations as Special Assistant to Ambassador at Large
3) Director of the Office of Eastern European Affairs, Department of State
1950:
1) Director of the Office of Eastern European Affairs, Department of State
2) Special Assistant to Ambassador at Large, Deputy Policy Adviser to the U.S. Delegation to the United Nations, New York
3) European Affairs Rep., U.S. Department of State, on Policy Comm. on Immigration and Naturalization
4) U.S. Department of State, Policy Planning Staff
1950-53: Counselor with Personal rank of Minister, Athens, Greece
1953: Deputy High Commissioner & Deputy Chief of Mission, Vienna, Austria
1954: Minister, Vientiane, Laos
1955-1956: Ambassador, Laos
1956-57: Minister, Paris, France
1957-58: Ambassador, Damascus, Syria
1958: Foreign Affairs Specialist, U.S. Department of State, Policy Planning Staff
1958-61: Ambassador, Rabat, Morocco
1961-66: U.S. Deputy Representative to the United Nations
1966:
  1) Resigned from the Foreign Service
  2) Chairman, United Nations Economic Commission for Asia and the Far East (ECAFE), New Delhi
  3) Bureau of Near East & South Asian Affairs, State Department
1966-69: Senior Fellow at the Council on Foreign Relations
1967:
  1) Consultant to the State Department, member of the Panel of Advisers on Near East, South Asian and International Organizations
  2) American Society of International Law Proceedings, Board of Review and Development: Conflict Control by Non-Violent Means (April)
  3) President Johnson's Special Envoy to the Middle East (May–June)
  4) Carnegie Endowment for International Peace Bermuda conference on the Vietnam War (December)
1968: 
  1) Head of the State Department Cyprus Study Group
  2) President Johnson's Special Envoy to the Middle East (July)
1969-71: U.S. Representative to the United Nations, New York.  President of the Security Council
1970-80: Member of the Dartmouth Conference Delegation
1971: Resigned from the Foreign Service 
1971-73:
  1) Counselor to UN Association
  2) Professor at Columbia University's School of International Affairs
1972: U.S. presidential envoy to Egypt
1973-75: President, National Committee on US-China Relations
1974: Professor at Rockefeller Foundation's Villa Serbelloni Study and Conference Center in Bellagio
1975: Presidential envoy to Egypt
1975-81:
  1) Senior Fellow, Brookings Institution
  2) Professor at the Institute for the Study of Diplomacy, Georgetown University
  3) Chairman, National Committee on US-China Relations
1976-81: Coordinator, Aspen Institute East-West, Iran and China Activities
1977: President Carter's Woodcock MIA delegation to Vietnam and Laos
1978: 1969 Security Council speech on Jerusalem codified in Camp David Accord Annex
1979: 
  1) Co-chairman Americans for SALT Strategic Arms Limitation Talks
  2) Honorary Co-chairman United Nations Association of the United States

Associations/memberships 
 Trustee of the American University in Cairo
 Council on Foreign Relations
 American Academy Political and Social Sciences
 American Society International Law
 National Planning Association
 Princeton Club
 University Club
 Century Association
 The Trilateral Commission
 Honorary Co-chairman UN Association of U.S. America
 Chairman Editorial Committee UN Association VISTA magazine
 Chairman of the Board, International House, New York City
 American Philosophical Society
 Visiting Committee of the Center for International Affairs (CFIA)
 Chairman of the National Advertising Review Board
 Editorial Board, Foreign Service Journal
 Editorial Committee, VISTA Magazine
 Institute for World Order
 Executive Director of the USUN-NYC Host Country Advisory Committee
 American Association for the Advancement of Science
 The Fund for Investigative Journalism
 Member of the Dartmouth Conferences
 Fund for Peace
 New Directions
 World Federalist Association
 Co-chair Americans for SALT
 American Council of Young Political Leaders (Board of Governors)
 Chairman Atlantic Council Working Group on the United Nations

Honors 
Hotchkiss Man of the Year
1958: Appointed Career Minister
1961: Lotus Award of Merit
1964: Appointed Career Ambassador
1964: Rockefeller Public Service Award
1967: Order of the Distinguished Diplomatic Service Merit First Class, Republic of Korea
1969: Honorary Degree, LL.D, Princeton University
1971: State Department Distinguished Honor Award
1974: Awarded The Foreign Service Cup
Honorary Degree, St. Lawrence University
Honorary Doctor of Laws, Hamilton College
Honorary Doctor of Social Science, University of Louisville

Testimony before Congress 
  1958: Executive Sessions of the Senate Foreign Relations Committee (Historical Series), Vol. X, Eighty-Fifth Congress, Second Session- Statement and questioning of Yost to be Ambassador to Morocco
  1961 - February 7: Executive Session, Tuesday- Nomination of Yost to be Deputy U.S. Representative, Security Council, United Nations
  1963 - October 29: Amendment to the United Nations Participation Act of 1945
  1967 - October: United States Senate, Committee on Foreign Relations, Submission of the Vietnam Conflict to the United Nations
  1969 - January 21: United States Senate, Committee on Foreign Relations, Nomination of Yost to be U.S. Representative to the UN
  1969 - January 21: Security Council Resolution on the Establishment of UN Peacekeeping Force
  1970 - March 9: Expansion of UN Headquarters and Privileges and Immunities of UN
  1970 - April 24: Senate Foreign Relations ad hoc Special Subcommittee on the Genocide Convention
  1970: Policy Toward Africa for the Seventies
  1971 - April 23: House Committee - Expansion of United Nations Headquarters
  1971 - May 26: Senate Foreign Relations Committee Fulbright Hearings - Statement on Southeast Asia
  1972 - May 18: Committee on Foreign Relations-Subcommittee on the Near East
  1973 - February 22: Statement to Foreign Affairs Committee-Rhodesian situation
  1973 - May 11: Senate Foreign Relations Committee-International Court of Justice
  1973, December 5: Foreign Affairs Committee-United Nations Peacekeeping
  1975, May 7: Senate Foreign Affairs Committee-U.S. Role in the United Nations
  1975 - October 6: Foreign Affairs Committee-Further Consideration of Sinai Agreements
  1979: Senate Hearings on International Human Rights Treaties
  1979 - September 6: Senate Committee on Foreign Relations-SALT II treaty
  1979 - November 14: Human Rights Treaties

Oral history interviews 
 Adlai Stevenson - September 1966 (John Bartlow Martin)
 John Foster Dulles Oral History Project – December 1966
 Meet the Press - 1970
 International Negotiations Project - Columbia University – May 1974
 Dwight D. Eisenhower Library – September 1978
 JFK Library – October 1978
 Larry King - 1980

Writings 
 The Age of Triumph and Frustration: Modern Dialogues (Speller, 1964)
 The Insecurity of Nations: International Relations in the Twentieth Century (Praeger, 1968)	
 The Pursuit of World Order (Villanova University Press, 1969)
 The Conduct and Misconduct of Foreign Affairs (Random House, 1972)
 History & Memory (Norton, 1980) - nominated for National Book Critics Circle General Non-fiction Award

Articles and papers 
 Carnegie Foundation "Bermuda" paper on Vietnam
 "The United Nations: Crisis of Confidence and Will," Foreign Affairs Magazine, Oct., 1966
 "Instability in International Relations," California Institute of Technology, April, 1967
 "The Arab-Israeli War: How It Began," Foreign Affairs Magazine, Jan., 1968
 "World Order and American Responsibility," Foreign Affairs Magazine, Oct., 1968
 "Israel and the Arabs: The Myths that Block Peace – Atlantic Magazine, 1969
 "Last Chance for Peace in the Mideast" Life Magazine, 1971
 "A Letter to a Soviet Friend", Life Magazine, September 24, 1971
 "The Instruments of American Foreign Policy," Foreign Affairs Magazine, Oct., 1971
 "The United Nations in the 1970s: a strategy for a unique era in the affairs of nations; a report, UNA-USA National Policy Panel on the United Nations in the 1970's, 1971
 "How to Save the United Nations" Saturday Review, Dec. 14, 1974
 "Toward Peace in the Middle East: Report of a Study Group, The Brookings Institution, 1975
 American Foreign Policy in a New Era (Aspen Institute for Humanistic Studies, 1976)
 What future for the UN? An Atlantic Dialogue. The reactions of Western Europeans and others to the report of the Atlantic Council's Working Group on the United Nations, (written with Lincoln Bloomfield), The Atlantic Council, 1977 "Observing Close Encounters in the Third World" - International Security, Vol. 3, No. 1 (Summer, 1978)
 "Contacts with the Opposition: A Symposium" – The Institute for the Study of Diplomacy, Georgetown University, 1979
 "National Security Revisited," Bulletin of the Atomic Scientists, October, 1980
  BCSIA, Volume 6, Number 3, Winter 1981/82 "Commentary: The Governance of International Affairs"
 "National and Collective Responsibility: The Governance of International Affairs," Aspen Institute ‘Wye Paper,’ 1981
 Syndicated columnist for The Washington Post Syndicated columnist for The Christian Science Monitor Recordings 
 JFK Library: President's Office Files, Presidential Recordings, tape # 49 (Cuban Missile Crisis)
 Radio Interview with Larry King (Washington, DC, 11/11/80)
 Interview with Charles W. Yost by Charley Holmes (United Nations, 1964)

 Obituaries 
 The New York Times
 

 From Yost biography 
 "Our Man in Morocco" Foreign Service Journal "The Emergence of a Diplomat" American Diplomacy "A Time of 'Great Malaise'" Foreign Service Journal Dissertations on Yost 
 2004: Victoria Lynn Penziner, Florida State University
"The Story Behind the Story: Experience and Identity in the Development of Palestinians Nationalism 
1917-1967"
 2009: Ronald Ranta, University College London
"The Wasted Decade: Israel’s Policies towards the Occupied Territories 1967-1977"
 2010: Ronan Nestor, University College Dublin
"The Role of US Ambassador to the UN, Charles Woodruff Yost, in the Formation of the Middle East Policy of
the Nixon Administration, 1969-1971"
 2019: Patrick Rosenow, Council of the Faculty of Social and Behavioral Sciences, Friedrich Schiller University, Jena
"The role of the Permanent Representative of the United States at the United Nations
An investigation based on case studies
Henry C. Lodge Jr., Charles W. Yost, Jeane J. Kirkpatrick and Madeleine K. Albright"
[Die Rolle der Ständigen Vertreter der USA bei den Vereinten Nationen Eine Untersuchung anhand der Fallbeispiele Henry C. Lodge Jr., Charles W. Yost, Jeane J. Kirkpatrick und Madeleine K. Albright]
https://www.db-thueringen.de/receive/dbt_mods_00038306

References

 Sources 
  On Laos
 "Some Left on Stretchers, Others on Straightjackets" - Yale Richmond (Foreign Service Journal, May 1988)
 "Ah! La Vie en Vientiane" - James F. Prosser (CANDOER, January 2001)
 Meeker, Oden - The Little World of Laos (Charles Scribner's Sons, New York, 1959)
 Menger, Matt J. - In the Valley of the Mekong: An American in Laos (Paterson, NJ St Anthony Guild Press 1970)
 Laos: Beyond the Revolution - Edited by Joseph J.Zasloff &Y Leonard Under (St Martin's Press, New York, 1991)
 Rives, L. Michael - The Association for Diplomatic Studies and Training Foreign Affairs Oral History Project
  On Thailand
 "Staying Behind in Bangkok: The OSS and American Intelligence in Postwar Thailand" - E. Bruce Reynolds (The Journal of Intelligence History 2, Winter 2002)
 McDonald, Alexander – Bangkok Editor (MacMillan, 1949)
  Thailand's Secret War: OSS, SOE and the Free Thai Underground During World War II - E. Bruce Reynolds 
 "Democracy, Elections and Internal Security: U.S. Policy Toward Laos in the Late 1950s" - Koji Terachi (Rutger's University)
 Wikipedia: King Ananda Mahidol Ananda Mahidol
  On Vietnam
 Hass, Richard (editor), O’Sullivan, Meghan L. (editor) - Honey and Vinegar: Incentives, Sanctions, and Foreign Policy (Brookings Institution Press 2000) Chapter 8-The United States and Vietnam: Road to Normalization - Brown, Frederick Z.
 On the UN
 Walton, Richard J. – The Remnants of Power: The Tragic Last Years of Adlai Stevenson (Coward-McCann, Inc., 1968)
 Beschloss, Michael - Reaching for Glory: Lyndon Johnson’s Secret White House Tapes, 1964-1965 (Touchtone, Simon & Schuster, New York, 2001)
 Finger, Seymour Maxwell - American Ambassadors at the UN: People, Politics, and Bureaucracy in Making Foreign Policy (UNITAR, 1992)
 McKeever, Porter – Adlai Stevenson: His Life and Legacy (William Morrow and Company, 1989)
 Martin, John Bartlow – Adlai Stevenson and the World (Anchor Press/Doubleday, 1978)
 Oral history of Charles Easton Rothwell
 May, Ernest R.& Zelikow, Philip D. Editors –The Kennedy Tapes: Inside the White House During the Cuban Missile Crisis – (The Belknap Press of Harvard University, 1997)
 Ambassador Christopher H. Phillips, Association for Diplomatic Studies, Foreign Affairs Oral History Program, Georgetown University
 United States Ambassador to the United Nations – William C. Moore (Hotchkiss Alumni News, April, 1969)
 Woodrow Wilson International Center for Scholars. Cold War International History Project.  Russian Documents on the Cuban Missile Crisis/14 September-21 October 1962
 Johnson, Walter Editor – The Papers of Adlai Stevenson: Ambassador to the United Nations, Volume VIII, 1961-1965 (Little, Brown and Company, 1979)
 May, Ernest R.& Zelikow, Philip D. Editors – The Presidential Recordings: John F. Kennedy, The Great Crisis, Volume Three, October 22–28, 1962 (W.W.Norton & Company, 2001)
 Foreign Relations, Organization of Foreign Policy; Information Policy; United Nations; Scientific Matters. Kennedy Library, Arthur M. Schlesinger Papers, UN Speeches, 8/2/61-8/11/61, Box WH22.  U.S. Strategy in the 16th General Assembly
 Schlesinger Jr., Arthur – A Thousand Days: John F. Kennedy in the White House - (Houghton Mifflin, 1965)
 Urquhart, Brian – Ralph Bunche: An American Odyssey (W.W. Norton & Company, 1993)
 Joseph Johnson UN interview 1985
 Harlan Cleveland Oral History, JFK Library
  On Iran
 Ganji, Moocher - Defying the Iranian Revolution (Praeger, 2002)
  On the Middle East
 "Cold War and Covert Action: The U.S. and Syria, 1945-1958" Middle East Journal, Winter 1990
 Yaqub, Salim - Containing Arab Nationalism: The Eisenhower Doctrine and the Middle East AlRoy, Gil Carl - The Prospects of War in the Middle East (Commentary/March 1969)
 Draper, Theordore - Israel and World Politics (Commentary/August 1967)
 Draper, Theodore - The United States & Israel (Commentary/April 1975)
 Nef, Donald – Warriors for Jerusalem: The Six Days that Changed the Middle East in 1967 (Amana Books, Brattleboro, Vermont, 1988)
 Sheehan, Edward R.F. – The Arabs, Israelis, and Kissinger: A Secret History of American Diplomacy in the Middle East (Reader's Digest Press, 1976)
 Riad, Mahmoud - The Struggle for Peace in the Middle East (Quartet Books, 1983)
 The United States' position on Jerulsalem as stated by its ambassador 
 The Dartmouth Conferences
 Voorhees, James – Dialogue Sustained: The Multilevel Peace Process and the Dartmouth Conference (United States Institute of Peace Press, Washington, D.C.; Kettering Foundation, 2002)
 On Morocco
 Nes, David, Association for Diplomatic Studies, Foreign Affairs Oral History Program, Georgetown University
 On Syria
 The Association for Diplomatic Studies and Training Foreign Affairs Oral History Project
 Jane Smiley Hart
 Parker T. Hart
 Curtis F. Jones
 On Greece
 Markezinis, Spyros - Truman Presidential Museum and Library Interviewer: Theodore A. Wilson - July 22, 1070 
 Goldbloom, Maurice - What Happened in Greece (Commentary/December 1967)
 The Role of Britain in Greek Politics and Military Operations: 1947-1952 - Eleftheria Delaporta
 The Economic Dimensions of the Marshall Plan in Greece, 147-1952 - Apostolos Vetsopoulos
 The Greek Rally (1952-1955) and the Reconstruction of the Greek Capitalism - Adrianos Sagkiotis
 Who is Afraid of the Americans? - Konstantina E. Botsiou
 The Association for Diplomatic Studies and Training Foreign Affairs Oral History Project
 Norbert L. Anschutz
 Betty Jane Peurifoy
 On the USSR
 Laqueur, Walter - America and the World: The Next Four Years (Commentary/March 1977)
 Laqueur, Walter - Rewriting History (Commentary/March 1973)
 On Human Rights
 Laqueur, Walter - The Issue of Human Rights (Commentary/May 1977)
  On China
 Borg, Dorothy & Heinrichs, Waldo Editors - Uncertain Years: Chinese Relations. 1947-1950
  On Potsdam
 James W. Riddleberger
  The Association for Diplomatic Studies and Training Foreign Affairs Oral History Project 
 ALfred Leroy Atherton Jr.
 Lucius D. Battle
 Robert O. Blake
 Samuel De Palma
 Dwight Dickinson
 C. Douglas Dillon
 Richard Funkhouser
 Samuel W. Lewis
 Cecil B. Lyon
 Robert B. Oakley
 Mary Seymour Olmsted
 Claiborne Pell
 Frederick H. Sacksteder
  Misc.
 "Will the Balance Balance at Home" Stanley Hoffmann (Foreign Policy Magazine'', Summer 1972)

Archives 
 United Nations Archives, Private Papers of the Secretary-General: U Thant: Post Retirement 1971–1974, Correspondence with Individuals and Organizations- Misc. - 03/10/1972-28/12/1972 (Series 0893, Box 11, File 5, Acc. DAG 1/5.2.9.2
 United Nations Archives, Peace-Keeping Operations Files of the Secretary-General: U Thant: Vietnam, Correspondence with Permanent Representatives of the United States of America to the UN and USA - 09/04/1965-08/10/1970 (Series S-0871, Box 1, File 9, DAG 1/5.2.2.3.1
 United Nations Archives, Peace-Keeping Operations. Files of the Secretary-General: U Thant: Other Countries, Laos - Visit from Harriman and Yost- 19/05/1962-19/05/1962
 United Nations Archives, Correspondence Files of the Secretary-General: U Thant: With Heads of State, Governments, Permanent Representatives and Observers, USA - Yost, Charles W.- 21/12/1968-13/04/1971 (Series 0882, Box 5, File 1, Acc. DAG 1/5.2.3
 United Nations Archives, Peace-Keeping Operations. Files of the Secretary-General: U Thant: Middle East, Four-Power Meetings [US, USSR, Great Britain, France] 21/06/1967-25/05/1971 (Series S-0861, Box 1, File 7, Acc. DAG 1/5.2.2.1
 John Foster Dulles Personal Papers
 Joseph E. Johnson Oral History

Foreign relations 
 Foreign Relations of the US, Diplomatic Papers, 1941, Vol.  IV, General: The Far East
 Foreign Relations of the US, Diplomatic Papers, 1945, Vol.  I, General: The United Nations
 Foreign Relations of the US, Diplomatic Papers, 1945, Vol.  VI, The British Commonwealth, The Far East
 Foreign Relations of the US, 1946, Vol.  I, General: The United Nations
 Foreign Relations of the US, 1946, Vol.  VIII, The Far East
 Foreign Relations of the US, 1947, Vol. II, Council of Foreign Ministers; Germany and Austria
 Foreign Relations of the US, 1949, Vol. II, United Nations Organization
 Foreign Relations of the US, 1949, Vol. III, Council of Foreign Ministers; Germany and Austria
 Foreign Relations of the US, 1950, Vol. I, Foreign Economic Policy
 Foreign Relations of the US, 1950, Vol. V, The Near East, South Asia, and Africa
 Foreign Relations of the US, 1952–1954, Vol. VII, Germany and Austria (in two parts) Part 2
 Foreign Relations of the US, 1961–1963, Vol. XI, Cuban Missile Crisis & Aftermath. #86, #93, #112, #138-139, #153, #156, #163, #183, #210, #212-213, #220,  #223, #233-234, #239, #245, #253, #256, #259
 Foreign Relations of the US, 1961–1963, Vol. XVI, Cyprus; Greece; Turkey, #33, #63, #76, #78, #207, #358, #359, #369
 Foreign Relations of the US, 1961–1963, Vol. XVII, Near East, 1961–1962, #242, #298
 Foreign Relations of the US, 1961–1963, Vol. XVIII, Near East, 1962–1963, #320
 Foreign Relations of the US, 1961–1963, Vol. XXIII, Southeast Asia
 Foreign Relations of the US 1961–63, Volume XXV, Organization of Foreign Policy; Information Policy; United Nations; Scientific Matters, #35, #162, #165, #168, #177, #187, #207, #284, #287, #299
 Foreign Relations of the US, 1964–1968, Vol. II, Vietnam, January–June 1965: Feb. 11-March 8, #161-162, #164
 Foreign Relations of the US, 1964–1968, Vol. II: Vietnam, July 29-November, 1965, #99,  #106 #114, #203, #207, #278
 Foreign Relations of the US, 1964–1968, Vol. XIX, Arab-Israeli Crisis and War, 1967,#128
 Foreign Relations of the US, 1969–1976, Vol. IV, Foreign Assistance, International Development, Trade Policies, 1969–1972, #26
 Foreign Relations of the US, 1969–1976, Vol. V, United Nations 1969–1972

|-

|-

|-

|-

1907 births
1981 deaths
People from Watertown, New York
Hotchkiss School alumni
Princeton University alumni
United States Foreign Service personnel
United States Career Ambassadors
Ambassadors of the United States to Laos
Ambassadors of the United States to Morocco
Ambassadors of the United States to Syria
Ambassadors of the United States to Thailand
Nixon administration cabinet members
Permanent Representatives of the United States to the United Nations
Writers from New York (state)
Writers from Washington, D.C.
20th-century American journalists
Foreign correspondents
American non-fiction writers
20th-century non-fiction writers
George Washington University faculty
Columbia University faculty
Brookings Institution people
The Washington Post columnists
The Christian Science Monitor people
American magazine editors
Council on Foreign Relations
University of Paris alumni